Fighter Squadron 13 or VF-13 was an aviation unit of the United States Navy. Established on 2 November 1943, it was disestablished on 20 October 1945. It was the first US Navy squadron to be designated as VF-13.

Operational history
In June 1944 the Franklin deployed to Pearl Harbor. On 24 October during the Battle of Leyte Gulf, CVG-13 participated in the sinking of the Japanese battleship Musashi. In early November 1944 following damage to Franklin in a Kamikaze attack, CVG-13 was temporarily landbased on Manus Island before re-embarking on Franklin as it proceeded to Puget Sound for repairs. In December 1944 CVG-13 was reforming at Naval Air Station Alameda, and then subsequently underwent training at Naval Air Station Fallon and Naval Air Station Livermore.

See also
History of the United States Navy
List of inactive United States Navy aircraft squadrons
List of United States Navy aircraft squadrons

References

Strike fighter squadrons of the United States Navy